Sumitra Devi may refer to:

 Sumitra Devi (politician) (1922–2001), Indian politician
 Sumitra Devi (actress) (1923–1990), Indian actress